Space exploration is the use of astronomy and space technology to explore outer space. While the exploration of space is carried out mainly by astronomers with telescopes, its physical exploration is conducted both by uncrewed robotic space probes and human spaceflight. Space exploration, like its classical form astronomy, is one of the main sources for space science.

While the observation of objects in space, known as astronomy, predates reliable recorded history, it was the development of large and relatively efficient rockets during the mid-twentieth century that allowed physical space exploration to become a reality.  The world's first large-scale experimental rocket program was Opel-RAK under the leadership of Fritz von Opel and Max Valier during the late 1920s leading to the first crewed rocket cars and rocket planes, which paved the way for the Nazi era V2 program and US and Soviet activities from 1950 onwards. The Opel-RAK program and the spectacular public demonstrations of ground and air vehicles drew large crowds, as well as caused global public excitement as so-called "Rocket Rumble" and had a large long-lasting impact on later spaceflight pioneers like Wernher von Braun. Common rationales for exploring space include advancing scientific research, national prestige, uniting different nations, ensuring the future survival of humanity, and developing military and strategic advantages against other countries.

The early era of space exploration was driven by a "Space Race" between the Soviet Union and the United States. The launch of the first human-made object to orbit Earth, the Soviet Union's Sputnik 1, on 4 October 1957, and the first Moon landing by the American Apollo 11 mission on 20 July 1969 are often taken as landmarks for this initial period. The Soviet space program achieved many of the first milestones, including the first living being in orbit in 1957, the first human spaceflight (Yuri Gagarin aboard Vostok 1) in 1961, the first spacewalk (by Alexei Leonov) on 18 March 1965, the first automatic landing on another celestial body in 1966, and the launch of the first space station (Salyut 1) in 1971. 
After the first 20 years of exploration, focus shifted from one-off flights to renewable hardware, such as the Space Shuttle program, and from competition to cooperation as with the International Space Station (ISS).

With the substantial completion of the ISS following STS-133 in March 2011, plans for space exploration by the U.S. remain in flux. Constellation, a Bush Administration program for a return to the Moon by 2020 was judged inadequately funded and unrealistic by an expert review panel reporting in 2009. 
The Obama Administration proposed a revision of Constellation in 2010 to focus on the development of the capability for crewed missions beyond low Earth orbit (LEO), envisioning extending the operation of the ISS beyond 2020, transferring the development of launch vehicles for human crews from NASA to the private sector, and developing technology to enable missions to beyond LEO, such as Earth–Moon L1, the Moon, Earth–Sun L2, near-Earth asteroids, and Phobos or Mars orbit.

In the 2000s, China initiated a successful crewed spaceflight program while India launched Chandraayan 1, while the European Union and Japan have also planned future crewed space missions. China, Russia, and Japan have advocated crewed missions to the Moon during the 21st century, while the European Union has advocated crewed missions to both the Moon and Mars during the 20th and 21st century.

History of exploration

First telescopes
The first telescope is said to have been invented in 1608 in the Netherlands by an eyeglass maker named Hans Lippershey, but their first uses in astronomy was by Galileo Galilei in 1609. In 1668 Isaac Newton built his own reflecting telescope, the first fully functional telescope of this kind, and a landmark for future developments due to its superior features over the previous Galilean telescope.

A string of discoveries in the Solar System (and beyond) followed, then and in the next centuries: the mountains of the Moon, the phases of Venus, the main satellites of Jupiter and Saturn, the rings of Saturn, many comets, the asteroids, the new planets Uranus and Neptune, and many more satellites.

The Orbiting Astronomical Observatory 2 was the first space telescope launched 1968, but the launching of Hubble Space Telescope in 1990 set a milestone. As of 1 December 2022, there were 5,284 confirmed exoplanets discovered. The Milky Way is estimated to contain 100–400 billion stars and more than 100 billion planets. There are at least 2 trillion galaxies in the observable universe. HD1 is the most distant known object from Earth, reported as 33.4 billion light-years away.

First outer space flights

MW 18014 was a German V-2 rocket test launch that took place on 20 June 1944, at the Peenemünde Army Research Center in Peenemünde. It was the first man-made object to reach outer space, attaining an apogee of 176 kilometers, which is well above the Kármán line. It was a vertical test launch. Although the rocket reached space, it did not reach orbital velocity, and therefore returned to Earth in an impact, becoming the first sub-orbital spaceflight.

First object in orbit
The first successful orbital launch was of the Soviet uncrewed Sputnik 1 ("Satellite 1") mission on 4 October 1957. It had two radio transmitters (20 and 40 MHz), which emitted "beeps" that could be heard by radios around the globe. Analysis of the radio signals was used to gather information about the electron density of the ionosphere, while temperature and pressure data was encoded in the duration of radio beeps. The results indicated that the satellite was not punctured by a meteoroid. Sputnik 1 was launched by an R-7 rocket. It burned up upon re-entry on 3 January 1958.

First human outer space flight
The first successful human spaceflight was Vostok 1 ("East 1"), carrying the 27-year-old Russian cosmonaut, Yuri Gagarin, on 12 April 1961. The spacecraft completed one orbit around the globe, lasting about 1 hour and 48 minutes. Gagarin's flight resonated around the world; it was a demonstration of the advanced Soviet space program and it opened an entirely new era in space exploration: human spaceflight.

First astronomical body space explorations 
The first artificial object to reach another celestial body was Luna 2 reaching the Moon in 1959. The first soft landing on another celestial body was performed by Luna 9 landing on the Moon on 3 February 1966. Luna 10 became the first artificial satellite of the Moon, entering in a lunar orbit on 3 April 1966.

The first crewed landing on another celestial body was performed by Apollo 11 on 20 July 1969, landing on the Moon. There have been a total of six spacecraft with humans landing on the Moon starting from 1969 to the last human landing in 1972.

The first interplanetary flyby was the 1961 Venera 1 flyby of Venus, though the 1962 Mariner 2 was the first flyby of Venus to return data (closest approach 34,773 kilometers). Pioneer 6 was the first satellite to orbit the Sun, launched on 16 December 1965. The other planets were first flown by in 1965 for Mars by Mariner 4, 1973 for Jupiter by Pioneer 10, 1974 for Mercury by Mariner 10, 1979 for Saturn by Pioneer 11, 1986 for Uranus by Voyager 2, 1989 for Neptune by Voyager 2. In 2015, the dwarf planets Ceres and Pluto were orbited by Dawn and passed by New Horizons, respectively. This accounts for flybys of each of the eight planets in the Solar System, the Sun, the Moon and Ceres & Pluto (2 of the 5 recognized dwarf planets).

The first interplanetary surface mission to return at least limited surface data from another planet was the 1970 landing of Venera 7, which returned data to Earth for 23 minutes from Venus. In 1975 the Venera 9 was the first to return images from the surface of another planet, returning images from Venus. In 1971 the Mars 3 mission achieved the first soft landing on Mars returning data for almost 20 seconds. Later much longer duration surface missions were achieved, including over six years of Mars surface operation by Viking 1 from 1975 to 1982 and over two hours of transmission from the surface of Venus by Venera 13 in 1982, the longest ever Soviet planetary surface mission. Venus and Mars are the two planets outside of Earth on which humans have conducted surface missions with uncrewed robotic spacecraft.

First space station 
Salyut 1 was the first space station of any kind, launched into low Earth orbit by the Soviet Union on 19 April 1971. The International Space Station is currently the only fully functional space station, inhabited continuously since the year 2000.

First interstellar space flight
Voyager 1 became the first human-made object to leave the Solar System into interstellar space on 25 August 2012. The probe passed the heliopause at 121 AU to enter interstellar space.

Farthest from Earth

It is the most distant human-made object from Earth.

GN-z11 is the most distant known object from Earth, reported as 13.4 billion light-years away.

Targets of exploration
Starting in the mid-20th century probes and then human mission were sent into Earth orbit, and then on to the Moon. Also, probes were sent throughout the known Solar system, and into Solar orbit. Uncrewed spacecraft have been sent into orbit around Saturn, Jupiter, Mars, Venus, and Mercury by the 21st century, and the most distance active spacecraft, Voyager 1 and 2 traveled beyond 100 times the Earth-Sun distance. The instruments were enough though that it is thought they have left the Sun's heliosphere, a sort of bubble of particles made in the Galaxy by the Sun's solar wind.

The Sun
The Sun is a major focus of space exploration. Being above the atmosphere in particular and Earth's magnetic field gives access to the solar wind and infrared and ultraviolet radiations that cannot reach Earth's surface. The Sun generates most space weather, which can affect power generation and transmission systems on Earth and interfere with, and even damage, satellites and space probes. Numerous spacecraft dedicated to observing the Sun, beginning with the Apollo Telescope Mount, have been launched and still others have had solar observation as a secondary objective. Parker Solar Probe, launched in 2018, will approach the Sun to within 1/9th the orbit of Mercury.

Mercury

Mercury remains the least explored of the Terrestrial planets. As of May 2013, the Mariner 10 and MESSENGER missions have been the only missions that have made close observations of Mercury. MESSENGER entered orbit around Mercury in March 2011, to further investigate the observations made by Mariner 10 in 1975 (Munsell, 2006b).
A third mission to Mercury, scheduled to arrive in 2025, BepiColombo is to include two probes. BepiColombo is a joint mission between Japan and the European Space Agency. MESSENGER and BepiColombo are intended to gather complementary data to help scientists understand many of the mysteries discovered by Mariner 10's flybys.

Flights to other planets within the Solar System are accomplished at a cost in energy, which is described by the net change in velocity of the spacecraft, or delta-v. Due to the relatively high delta-v to reach Mercury and its proximity to the Sun, it is difficult to explore and orbits around it are rather unstable.

Venus

Venus was the first target of interplanetary flyby and lander missions and, despite one of the most hostile surface environments in the Solar System, has had more landers sent to it (nearly all from the Soviet Union) than any other planet in the Solar System. The first flyby was the 1961 Venera 1, though the 1962 Mariner 2 was the first flyby to successfully return data. Mariner 2 has been followed by several other flybys by multiple space agencies often as part of missions using a Venus flyby to provide a gravitational assist en route to other celestial bodies. In 1967 Venera 4 became the first probe to enter and directly examine the atmosphere of Venus. In 1970, Venera 7 became the first successful lander to reach the surface of Venus and by 1985 it had been followed by eight additional successful Soviet Venus landers which provided images and other direct surface data. Starting in 1975 with the Soviet orbiter Venera 9 some ten successful orbiter missions have been sent to Venus, including later missions which were able to map the surface of Venus using radar to pierce the obscuring atmosphere.

Earth

Space exploration has been used as a tool to understand Earth as a celestial object. Orbital missions can provide data for Earth that can be difficult or impossible to obtain from a purely ground-based point of reference.

For example, the existence of the Van Allen radiation belts was unknown until their discovery by the United States' first artificial satellite, Explorer 1. These belts contain radiation trapped by Earth's magnetic fields, which currently renders construction of habitable space stations above 1000 km impractical.
Following this early unexpected discovery, a large number of Earth observation satellites have been deployed specifically to explore Earth from a space based perspective. These satellites have significantly contributed to the understanding of a variety of Earth-based phenomena. For instance, the hole in the ozone layer was found by an artificial satellite that was exploring Earth's atmosphere, and satellites have allowed for the discovery of archeological sites or geological formations that were difficult or impossible to otherwise identify.

Moon 

The Moon was the first celestial body to be the object of space exploration. It holds the distinctions of being the first remote celestial object to be flown by, orbited, and landed upon by spacecraft, and the only remote celestial object ever to be visited by humans.

In 1959 the Soviets obtained the first images of the far side of the Moon, never previously visible to humans. The U.S. exploration of the Moon began with the Ranger 4 impactor in 1962. Starting in 1966 the Soviets successfully deployed a number of landers to the Moon which were able to obtain data directly from the Moon's surface; just four months later, Surveyor 1 marked the debut of a successful series of U.S. landers. The Soviet uncrewed missions culminated in the Lunokhod program in the early 1970s, which included the first uncrewed rovers and also successfully brought lunar soil samples to Earth for study. This marked the first (and to date the only) automated return of extraterrestrial soil samples to Earth. Uncrewed exploration of the Moon continues with various nations periodically deploying lunar orbiters, and in 2008 the Indian Moon Impact Probe.

Crewed exploration of the Moon began in 1968 with the Apollo 8 mission that successfully orbited the Moon, the first time any extraterrestrial object was orbited by humans. In 1969, the Apollo 11 mission marked the first time humans set foot upon another world. Crewed exploration of the Moon did not continue for long. The Apollo 17 mission in 1972 marked the sixth landing and the most recent human visit. Artemis 2 will flyby the Moon in 2022. Robotic missions are still pursued vigorously.

Mars

The exploration of Mars has been an important part of the space exploration programs of the Soviet Union (later Russia), the United States, Europe, Japan and India. Dozens of robotic spacecraft, including orbiters, landers, and rovers, have been launched toward Mars since the 1960s. These missions were aimed at gathering data about current conditions and answering questions about the history of Mars. The questions raised by the scientific community are expected to not only give a better appreciation of the red planet but also yield further insight into the past, and possible future, of Earth.

The exploration of Mars has come at a considerable financial cost with roughly two-thirds of all spacecraft destined for Mars failing before completing their missions, with some failing before they even began. Such a high failure rate can be attributed to the complexity and large number of variables involved in an interplanetary journey, and has led researchers to jokingly speak of The Great Galactic Ghoul which subsists on a diet of Mars probes. This phenomenon is also informally known as the "Mars Curse".
In contrast to overall high failure rates in the exploration of Mars, India has become the first country to achieve success of its maiden attempt.  India's Mars Orbiter Mission (MOM) is one of the least expensive interplanetary missions ever undertaken with an approximate total cost of  450 Crore. The first mission to Mars by any Arab country has been taken up by the United Arab Emirates. Called the Emirates Mars Mission, it is scheduled for launch in 2020. The uncrewed exploratory probe has been named "Hope Probe" and will be sent to Mars to study its atmosphere in detail.

Phobos 

The Russian space mission Fobos-Grunt, which launched on 9 November 2011 experienced a failure leaving it stranded in low Earth orbit. It was to begin exploration of the Phobos and Martian circumterrestrial orbit, and study whether the moons of Mars, or at least Phobos, could be a "trans-shipment point" for spaceships traveling to Mars.

Asteroids

Until the advent of space travel, objects in the asteroid belt were merely pinpricks of light in even the largest telescopes, their shapes and terrain remaining a mystery.
Several asteroids have now been visited by probes, the first of which was Galileo, which flew past two: 951 Gaspra in 1991, followed by 243 Ida in 1993. Both of these lay near enough to Galileos planned trajectory to Jupiter that they could be visited at acceptable cost. The first landing on an asteroid was performed by the NEAR Shoemaker probe in 2000, following an orbital survey of the object, 433 Eros. The dwarf planet Ceres and the asteroid 4 Vesta, two of the three largest asteroids, were visited by NASA's Dawn spacecraft, launched in 2007.

Hayabusa was a robotic spacecraft developed by the Japan Aerospace Exploration Agency to return a sample of material from the small near-Earth asteroid 25143 Itokawa to Earth for further analysis. Hayabusa was launched on 9 May 2003 and rendezvoused with Itokawa in mid-September 2005. After arriving at Itokawa, Hayabusa studied the asteroid's shape, spin, topography, color, composition, density, and history. In November 2005, it landed on the asteroid twice to collect samples. The spacecraft returned to Earth on 13 June 2010.

Jupiter

The exploration of Jupiter has consisted solely of a number of automated NASA spacecraft visiting the planet since 1973. A large majority of the missions have been "flybys", in which detailed observations are taken without the probe landing or entering orbit; such as in Pioneer and Voyager programs. The Galileo and Juno spacecraft are the only spacecraft to have entered the planet's orbit. As Jupiter is believed to have only a relatively small rocky core and no real solid surface, a landing mission is precluded.

Reaching Jupiter from Earth requires a delta-v of 9.2 km/s, which is comparable to the 9.7 km/s delta-v needed to reach low Earth orbit. Fortunately, gravity assists through planetary flybys can be used to reduce the energy required at launch to reach Jupiter, albeit at the cost of a significantly longer flight duration.

Jupiter has 80 known moons, many of which have relatively little known information about them.

Saturn

Saturn has been explored only through uncrewed spacecraft launched by NASA, including one mission (Cassini–Huygens) planned and executed in cooperation with other space agencies. These missions consist of flybys in 1979 by Pioneer 11, in 1980 by Voyager 1, in 1982 by Voyager 2 and an orbital mission by the Cassini spacecraft, which lasted from 2004 until 2017.

Saturn has at least 62 known moons, although the exact number is debatable since Saturn's rings are made up of vast numbers of independently orbiting objects of varying sizes. The largest of the moons is Titan, which holds the distinction of being the only moon in the Solar System with an atmosphere denser and thicker than that of Earth.  Titan holds the distinction of being the only object in the Outer Solar System that has been explored with a lander, the Huygens probe deployed by the Cassini spacecraft.

Uranus

The exploration of Uranus has been entirely through the Voyager 2 spacecraft, with no other visits currently planned. Given its axial tilt of 97.77°, with its polar regions exposed to sunlight or darkness for long periods, scientists were not sure what to expect at Uranus. The closest approach to Uranus occurred on 24 January 1986. Voyager 2 studied the planet's unique atmosphere and magnetosphere. Voyager 2 also examined its ring system and the moons of Uranus including all five of the previously known moons, while discovering an additional ten previously unknown moons.

Images of Uranus proved to have a very uniform appearance, with no evidence of the dramatic storms or atmospheric banding evident on Jupiter and Saturn. Great effort was required to even identify a few clouds in the images of the planet. The magnetosphere of Uranus, however, proved to be unique, being profoundly affected by the planet's unusual axial tilt. In contrast to the bland appearance of Uranus itself, striking images were obtained of the Moons of Uranus, including evidence that Miranda had been unusually geologically active.

Neptune
The possibility of a Neptune Orbiter has been discussed, but no other missions have been given serious thought.

Although the extremely uniform appearance of Uranus during Voyager 2s visit in 1986 had led to expectations that Neptune would also have few visible atmospheric phenomena, the spacecraft found that Neptune had obvious banding, visible clouds, auroras, and even a conspicuous anticyclone storm system rivaled in size only by Jupiter's Great Red Spot. Neptune also proved to have the fastest winds of any planet in the Solar System, measured as high as 2,100 km/h. Voyager 2 also examined Neptune's ring and moon system. It discovered 900 complete rings and additional partial ring "arcs" around Neptune. In addition to examining Neptune's three previously known moons, Voyager 2 also discovered five previously unknown moons, one of which, Proteus, proved to be the last largest moon in the system. Data from Voyager 2 supported the view that Neptune's largest moon, Triton, is a captured Kuiper belt object.

Pluto
The dwarf planet Pluto presents significant challenges for spacecraft because of its great distance from Earth (requiring high velocity for reasonable trip times) and small mass (making capture into orbit very difficult at present). Voyager 1 could have visited Pluto, but controllers opted instead for a close flyby of Saturn's moon Titan, resulting in a trajectory incompatible with a Pluto flyby. Voyager 2 never had a plausible trajectory for reaching Pluto.

After an intense political battle, a mission to Pluto dubbed New Horizons was granted funding from the United States government in 2003. New Horizons was launched successfully on 19 January 2006. In early 2007 the craft made use of a gravity assist from Jupiter. Its closest approach to Pluto was on 14 July 2015; scientific observations of Pluto began five months prior to closest approach and continued for 16 days after the encounter.

Kuiper Belt Objects
The New Horizons mission also did a flyby of the small planetesimal Arrokoth, in the Kuiper belt, in 2019. This was its first extended mission.

Comets

Although many comets have been studied from Earth sometimes with centuries-worth of observations, only a few comets have been closely visited. In 1985, the International Cometary Explorer conducted the first comet fly-by (21P/Giacobini-Zinner) before joining the Halley Armada studying the famous comet. The Deep Impact probe smashed into 9P/Tempel to learn more about its structure and composition and the Stardust mission returned samples of another comet's tail. The Philae lander successfully landed on Comet Churyumov–Gerasimenko in 2014 as part of the broader Rosetta mission.

Deep space exploration

Deep space exploration is the branch of astronomy, astronautics and space technology that is involved with the exploration of distant regions of outer space. Physical exploration of space is conducted both by human spaceflights (deep-space astronautics) and by robotic spacecraft.

Some of the best candidates for future deep space engine technologies include anti-matter, nuclear power and beamed propulsion. The latter, beamed propulsion, appears to be the best candidate for deep space exploration presently available, since it uses known physics and known technology that is being developed for other purposes.

Future of space exploration

 Breakthrough Starshot 

Breakthrough Starshot is a research and engineering project by the Breakthrough Initiatives to develop a proof-of-concept fleet of light sail spacecraft named StarChip, to be capable of making the journey to the Alpha Centauri star system 4.37 light-years away. It was founded in 2016 by Yuri Milner, Stephen Hawking, and Mark Zuckerberg.

 Asteroids 

An article in science magazine Nature suggested the use of asteroids as a gateway for space exploration, with the ultimate destination being Mars. In order to make such an approach viable, three requirements need to be fulfilled: first, "a thorough asteroid survey to find thousands of nearby bodies suitable for astronauts to visit"; second, "extending flight duration and distance capability to ever-increasing ranges out to Mars"; and finally, "developing better robotic vehicles and tools to enable astronauts to explore an asteroid regardless of its size, shape or spin". Furthermore, using asteroids would provide astronauts with protection from galactic cosmic rays, with mission crews being able to land on them without great risk to radiation exposure.

 James Webb Space Telescope 

The James Webb Space Telescope (JWST or "Webb") is a space telescope that is the successor to the Hubble Space Telescope. The JWST will provide greatly improved resolution and sensitivity over the Hubble, and will enable a broad range of investigations across the fields of astronomy and cosmology, including observing some of the most distant events and objects in the universe, such as the formation of the first galaxies. Other goals include understanding the formation of stars and planets, and direct imaging of exoplanets and novas.

The primary mirror of the JWST, the Optical Telescope Element, is composed of 18 hexagonal mirror segments made of gold-plated beryllium which combine to create a  diameter mirror that is much larger than the Hubble's  mirror.  Unlike the Hubble, which observes in the near ultraviolet, visible, and near infrared (0.1 to 1 μm) spectra, the JWST will observe in a lower frequency range, from long-wavelength visible light through mid-infrared (0.6 to 27 μm), which will allow it to observe high redshift objects that are too old and too distant for the Hubble to observe. The telescope must be kept very cold in order to observe in the infrared without interference, so it will be deployed in space near the Earth–Sun  Lagrangian point, and a large sunshield made of silicon- and aluminum-coated Kapton will keep its mirror and instruments below .

 Artemis program 

The Artemis program is an ongoing crewed spaceflight program carried out by NASA, U.S. commercial spaceflight companies, and international partners such as ESA, with the goal of landing "the first woman and the next man" on the Moon, specifically at the lunar south pole region by 2024. Artemis would be the next step towards the long-term goal of establishing a sustainable presence on the Moon, laying the foundation for private companies to build a lunar economy, and eventually sending humans to Mars.

In 2017, the lunar campaign was authorized by Space Policy Directive 1, utilizing various ongoing spacecraft programs such as Orion, the Lunar Gateway, Commercial Lunar Payload Services, and adding an undeveloped crewed lander. The Space Launch System will serve as the primary launch vehicle for Orion, while commercial launch vehicles are planned for use to launch various other elements of the campaign. NASA requested $1.6 billion in additional funding for Artemis for fiscal year 2020, while the Senate Appropriations Committee requested from NASA a five-year budget profile which is needed for evaluation and approval by Congress.

Rationales

The research that is conducted by national space exploration agencies, such as NASA and Roscosmos, is one of the reasons supporters cite to justify government expenses. Economic analyses of the NASA programs often showed ongoing economic benefits (such as NASA spin-offs), generating many times the revenue of the cost of the program. It is also argued that space exploration would lead to the extraction of resources on other planets and especially asteroids, which contain billions of dollars that worth of minerals and metals. Such expeditions could generate a lot of revenue. In addition, it has been argued that space exploration programs help inspire youth to study in science and engineering. Space exploration also gives scientists the ability to perform experiments in other settings and expand humanity's knowledge.

Another claim is that space exploration is a necessity to mankind and that staying on Earth will lead to extinction. Some of the reasons are lack of natural resources, comets, nuclear war, and worldwide epidemic. Stephen Hawking, renowned British theoretical physicist, said that "I don't think the human race will survive the next thousand years, unless we spread into space. There are too many accidents that can befall life on a single planet. But I'm an optimist. We will reach out to the stars." Arthur C. Clarke (1950) presented a summary of motivations for the human exploration of space in his non-fiction semi-technical monograph Interplanetary Flight. He argued that humanity's choice is essentially between expansion off Earth into space, versus cultural (and eventually biological) stagnation and death.
These motivations could be attributed to one of the first rocket scientists in NASA, Wernher von Braun, and his vision of humans moving beyond Earth. The basis of this plan was to:

"Develop multi-stage rockets capable of placing satellites, animals, and humans in space.

Development of large, winged reusable spacecraft capable of carrying humans and equipment into Earth orbit in a way that made space access routine and cost-effective.

Construction of a large, permanently occupied space station to be used as a platform both to observe Earth and from which to launch deep space expeditions.

Launching the first human flights around the Moon, leading to the first landings of humans on the Moon, with the intent of exploring that body and establishing permanent lunar bases.

Assembly and fueling of spaceships in Earth orbit for the purpose of sending humans to Mars with the intent of eventually colonizing that planet".

Known as the Von Braun Paradigm, the plan was formulated to lead humans in the exploration of space. Von Braun's vision of human space exploration served as the model for efforts in space exploration well into the twenty-first century, with NASA incorporating this approach into the majority of their projects. The steps were followed out of order, as seen by the Apollo program reaching the moon before the space shuttle program was started, which in turn was used to complete the International Space Station. Von Braun's Paradigm formed NASA's drive for human exploration, in the hopes that humans discover the far reaches of the universe.

NASA has produced a series of public service announcement videos supporting the concept of space exploration.

Overall, the public remains largely supportive of both crewed and uncrewed space exploration. According to an Associated Press Poll conducted in July 2003, 71% of U.S. citizens agreed with the statement that the space program is "a good investment", compared to 21% who did not.

 Human nature 

Space advocacy and space policy regularly invokes exploration as a human nature.

This advocacy has been criticized by scholars as essentializing and continuation of colonialism, particularly manifest destiny, making space exploration misaligned with science and a less inclusive field.

Topics

Spaceflight

Spaceflight is the use of space technology to achieve the flight of spacecraft into and through outer space.

Spaceflight is used in space exploration, and also in commercial activities like space tourism and satellite telecommunications. Additional non-commercial uses of spaceflight include space observatories, reconnaissance satellites and other Earth observation satellites.

A spaceflight typically begins with a rocket launch, which provides the initial thrust to overcome the force of gravity and propels the spacecraft from the surface of Earth. Once in space, the motion of a spacecraft—both when unpropelled and when under propulsion—is covered by the area of study called astrodynamics. Some spacecraft remain in space indefinitely, some disintegrate during atmospheric reentry, and others reach a planetary or lunar surface for landing or impact.

Satellites

Satellites are used for a large number of purposes. Common types include military (spy) and civilian Earth observation satellites, communication satellites, navigation satellites, weather satellites, and research satellites. Space stations and human spacecraft in orbit are also satellites.

Commercialization of space

The commercialization of space first started out with the launching of private satellites by NASA or other space agencies. Current examples of the commercial satellite use of space include satellite navigation systems, satellite television and satellite radio. The next step of commercialization of space was seen as human spaceflight. Flying humans safely to and from space had become routine to NASA. Reusable spacecraft were an entirely new engineering challenge, something only seen in novels and films like Star Trek and War of the Worlds. Great names like Buzz Aldrin supported the use of making a reusable vehicle like the space shuttle. Aldrin held that reusable spacecraft were the key in making space travel affordable, stating that the use of "passenger space travel is a huge potential market big enough to justify the creation of reusable launch vehicles". How can the public go against the words of one of America's best known heroes in space exploration? After all exploring space is the next great expedition, following the example of Lewis and Clark.Space tourism is the next step reusable vehicles in the commercialization of space. The purpose of this form of space travel is used by individuals for the purpose of personal pleasure.

Private spaceflight companies such as SpaceX and Blue Origin, and commercial space stations such as the Axiom Space and the Bigelow Commercial Space Station have dramatically changed the landscape of space exploration, and will continue to do so in the near future.

Alien life

Astrobiology is the interdisciplinary study of life in the universe, combining aspects of astronomy, biology and geology. It is focused primarily on the study of the origin, distribution and evolution of life. It is also known as exobiology''' (from Greek: έξω, exo, "outside"). The term "Xenobiology" has been used as well, but this is technically incorrect because its terminology means "biology of the foreigners". Astrobiologists must also consider the possibility of life that is chemically entirely distinct from any life found on Earth. In the Solar System some of the prime locations for current or past astrobiology are on Enceladus, Europa, Mars, and Titan.

Human spaceflight and habitation

Valeri Polyakov's record single spaceflight of almost 438 days aboard the Mir space station has not been surpassed. The health effects of space have been well documented through years of research conducted in the field of aerospace medicine. Analog environments similar to those one may experience in space travel (like deep sea submarines) have been used in this research to further explore the relationship between isolation and extreme environments. It is imperative that the health of the crew be maintained as any deviation from baseline may compromise the integrity of the mission as well as the safety of the crew, hence the reason why astronauts must endure rigorous medical screenings and tests prior to embarking on any missions. However, it does not take long for the environmental dynamics of spaceflight to commence its toll on the human body; for example, space motion sickness (SMS) – a condition which affects the neurovestibular system and culminates in mild to severe signs and symptoms such as vertigo, dizziness, fatigue, nausea, and disorientation – plagues almost all space travelers within their first few days in orbit. Space travel can also have a profound impact on the psyche of the crew members as delineated in anecdotal writings composed after their retirement. Space travel can adversely affect the body's natural biological clock (circadian rhythm); sleep patterns causing sleep deprivation and fatigue; and social interaction; consequently, residing in a Low Earth Orbit (LEO) environment for a prolonged amount of time can result in both mental and physical exhaustion. Long-term stays in space reveal issues with bone and muscle loss in low gravity, immune system suppression, and radiation exposure. The lack of gravity causes fluid to rise upward which can cause pressure to build up in the eye, resulting in vision problems; the loss of bone minerals and densities; cardiovascular deconditioning; and decreased endurance and muscle mass.

Radiation is perhaps the most insidious health hazard to space travelers as it is invisible to the naked eye and can cause cancer. Space craft are no longer protected from the sun's radiation as they are positioned above the Earth's magnetic field; the danger of radiation is even more potent when one enters deep space. The hazards of radiation can be ameliorated through protective shielding on the spacecraft, alerts, and dosimetry.

Fortunately, with new and rapidly evolving technological advancements, those in Mission Control are able to monitor the health of their astronauts more closely utilizing telemedicine. One may not be able to completely evade the physiological effects of space flight, but they can be mitigated. For example, medical systems aboard space vessels such as the International Space Station (ISS) are well equipped and designed to counteract the effects of lack of gravity and weightlessness; on-board treadmills can help prevent muscle loss and reduce the risk of developing premature osteoporosis. Additionally, a crew medical officer is appointed for each ISS mission and a flight surgeon is available 24/7 via the ISS Mission Control Center located in Houston, Texas. Although the interactions are intended to take place in real time, communications between the space and terrestrial crew may become delayed – sometimes by as much as 20 minutes – as their distance from each other increases when the spacecraft moves further out of LEO; because of this the crew are trained and need to be prepared to respond to any medical emergencies that may arise on the vessel as the ground crew are hundreds of miles away. As one can see, travelling and possibly living in space poses many challenges. Many past and current concepts for the continued exploration and colonization of space focus on a return to the Moon as a "stepping stone" to the other planets, especially Mars. At the end of 2006 NASA announced they were planning to build a permanent Moon base with continual presence by 2024.

Beyond the technical factors that could make living in space more widespread, it has been suggested that the lack of private property, the inability or difficulty in establishing property rights in space, has been an impediment to the development of space for human habitation. Since the advent of space technology in the latter half of the twentieth century, the ownership of property in space has been murky, with strong arguments both for and against. In particular, the making of national territorial claims in outer space and on celestial bodies has been specifically proscribed by the Outer Space Treaty, which had been, ratified by all spacefaring nations.
Space colonization, also called space settlement and space humanization, would be the permanent autonomous (self-sufficient) human habitation of locations outside Earth, especially of natural satellites or planets such as the Moon or Mars, using significant amounts of in-situ resource utilization.

 Human representation and participation 

Participation and representation of humanity in space is an issue ever since the first phase of space exploration. Some rights of non-spacefaring countries have been mostly secured through international space law, declaring space the "province of all mankind", understanding spaceflight as its resource, though sharing of space for all humanity is still criticized as imperialist and lacking. Additionally to international inclusion, the inclusion of women and people of colour has also been lacking. To reach a more inclusive spaceflight some organizations like the Justspace Alliance and IAU featured Inclusive Astronomy have been formed in recent years.

Women

The first woman to ever enter space was Valentina Tereshkova. She flew in 1963 but it was not until the 1980s that another woman entered space again. All astronauts were required to be military test pilots at the time and women were not able to enter this career, this is one reason for the delay in allowing women to join space crews. After the rule changed, Svetlana Savitskaya became the second woman to enter space, she was also from the Soviet Union. Sally Ride became the next woman to enter space and the first woman to enter space through the United States program.

Since then, eleven other countries have allowed women astronauts. The first all female space walk occurred in 2018, including Christina Koch and Jessica Meir. These two women have both participated in separate space walks with NASA. The first woman to go to the moon is planned for 2024.

Despite these developments women are still underrepresented among astronauts and especially cosmonauts. Issues that block potential applicants from the programs and limit the space missions they are able to go on, are for example:
 agencies limiting women to half as much time in space than men, arguing with unresearched potential risks for cancer.
 a lack of space suits sized appropriately for female astronauts.

Art

Artistry in and from space ranges from signals, capturing and arranging material like Yuri Gagarin's selfie in space or the image The Blue Marble, over drawings like the first one in space by cosmonaut and artist Alexei Leonov, music videos like Chris Hadfield's cover of Space Oddity on board the ISS, to permanent installations on celestial bodies like on the Moon.

See also

 Discovery and exploration of the Solar System
 Spacecraft propulsion
 List of crewed spacecraft
 List of missions to Mars
 List of missions to the outer planets
 List of landings on extraterrestrial bodies
 List of spaceflight records

Robotic space exploration programs

 Robotic spacecraft
 Timeline of planetary exploration
 Landings on other planets
 Pioneer program
 Luna program
 Zond program
 Venera program
 Mars probe program
 Ranger program
 Mariner program
 Surveyor program
 Viking program
 Voyager program
 Vega program
 Phobos program
 Discovery program
 Chandrayaan Program
 Mangalyaan Program
 Chang'e Program
 Private Astrobotic Technology Program

Living in space
 Interplanetary contamination

Animals in space

 Animals in space
 Monkeys in space
 Russian space dogs

Humans in space

 Astronauts
 List of human spaceflights
 List of human spaceflights by program
 Vostok program
 Mercury program
 Voskhod program
 Gemini program
 Soyuz program
 Apollo program
 Salyut program
 Skylab
 Space Shuttle program
 Mir
 International Space Station
 Vision for Space Exploration
 Aurora Programme
 Tier One
 Effect of spaceflight on the human body
 Space architecture
 
 
 Space archaeology
 flexible path destinations set

Recent and future developments

 Commercial astronauts
 Artemis program
 Energy development
 Exploration of Mars
 Space tourism
 Private spaceflight
 Space colonization
 Interstellar spaceflight
 Deep space exploration
 Human outpost
 Mars to Stay
 NewSpace
 NASA lunar outpost concepts

Other

 List of spaceflights
 Timeline of Solar System exploration
 List of artificial objects on extra-terrestrial surfaces
 Space station
 Space telescope
 Sample return mission
 Atmospheric reentry
 Space and survival
 List of spaceflight-related accidents and incidents
 Religion in space
 Militarisation of space
 French space program
 Russian explorers
 U.S. space exploration history on U.S. stamps
 Deep-sea exploration
 Arctic exploration

References

Further reading

  An overview of the history of space exploration and predictions for the future.

External links

 Building a Spacefaring Civilization 
 Chronology of space exploration, astrobiology, exoplanets and news 
 Space related news
 Space Exploration Network
 NASA's website on human space travel
 NASA's website on space exploration technology
 "America's Space Program: Exploring a New Frontier", a National Park Service Teaching with Historic Places (TwHP) lesson plan
 The Soviet-Russian Spaceflight's History Photoarchive
 The 21 Greatest Space Photos Ever  – slideshow by Life Magazine''
 "From Stargazers to Starships", extensive educational web site and course covering spaceflight, astronomy and related physics
 We Are The Explorers, NASA Promotional Video (Press Release)

 
Exploration